Asemini is a tribe of beetles in the subfamily Spondylidinae, containing the following genera and species:

Genera
BioLib lists:
 Arhopalus Audinet-Serville, 1834
 Asemum Eschscholtz, 1830
 Atripatus Fairmaire, 1902
 Cephalallus Sharp, 1905
 Derolophodes Brancsik, 1898 incertae sedis
 Hypostilbus Brancsik, 1898
 Marocaulus Fairmaire, 1899
 Megasemum Kraatz, 1879
 Nothorhina L. Redtenbacher, 1845
 Tetropium Kirby, 1837
 †Palaeotetropium Vitali, 2011

Selected species
 Genus Megasemum
 Megasemum asperum (LeConte, 1854)
 Megasemum quadricostulatum Kraatz, 1879

References

Spondylidinae